Sir Cennydd George Traherne  (14 December 1910 – 26 January 1995) was a notable Welsh landowner.

Sir Cennydd was born at Coedarhydyglyn near Cardiff, and was educated at Wellington College and Brasenose College, Oxford.

He owned Dyffryn House in Glamorgan, among other properties, but in 1939 he leased it to the local authority.  After distinguished service in World War II, he went into politics, but failed to be elected in 1945 as MP for the Pontypridd constituency. He was made a Knight of the Garter in 1970. His appointment was the 941st appointment to the Order of the Garter since its creation in 1348. He was Lord Lieutenant of Glamorgan from 1952 until 1974 when, on the splitting of the lieutenancy, he became Lord Lieutenant of South, Mid and West Glamorgan with a lieutenant serving under him for each. He retired from the post in 1985.

He was awarded the Freedom of the Borough of the Vale of Glamorgan on 19 March 1984.
He was awarded the Freedom of the City of Cardiff on 29 January 1985.

After his death in 1995 his Order of the Garter Banner was moved from St George's Chapel, Windsor Castle to Llandaff Cathedral in Cardiff.

References

1910 births
1995 deaths
Welsh landowners
Knights of the Garter
Lord-Lieutenants of Mid Glamorgan
Lord-Lieutenants of South Glamorgan
Lord-Lieutenants of West Glamorgan
Lord-Lieutenants of Glamorgan
20th-century British businesspeople